Forward Operating Base Khar Nikah or more simply FOB Khar Nikah is a former Forward Operating Base in Afghanistan operated by the International Security Assistance Force (ISAF) under Operation Herrick (OP H).

It was formerly known as FOB Keenan.

Units
FOB Keenan (2007-2010)
 OP H 6 (April – October 2007)
 B Company, 1st Battalion, The Worcestershire and Sherwood Foresters Regiment (29th/45th Foot) (Renamed 2nd Battalion, The Mercian Regiment) built the base.
 OP H 7 (October 2007 - April 2008)
 No. 10 Platoon, No. 3 Company, 1st Battalion, Coldstream Guards.
 Signals Platoon
 Support from Sniper Section, 1st Battalion, Coldstream Guards during December.
 OP H 8 (April 2008 - October 2008)
 5Scots (Argyll & Sutherland Highlanders) 2Scots Royal highland fusiliers) attached to 1st Battalion, The Royal Irish Regiment (27th (Inniskilling), 83rd, 87th and Ulster Defence Regiment) supported by - Imjin Company (2 R IRISH Territorial unit) 

FOB Khar Nikah
 OP H12 (May - Oct 2010)
 Gurkha Company, 1st Battalion, Mercian Regiment (Cheshire)
 OP H 13 (October 2010 - April 2011)
No. 2 Company, 1st Battalion, Irish Guards
 OP H 14 (May - Oct 2011)
C Company, 3rd Battalion, Mercian Regiment (formerly 'The Staffords')
 OP H 15 (Oct 2011 - May 2012)
The Royal Gurkha Rifles

References

Citations

Bibliography

War in Afghanistan (2001–2021)
Military bases of the United Kingdom in Afghanistan